Mai Yamani (born 6 September 1956) is an independent Saudi scholar, author and anthropologist.

Early life
Yamani was born in Cairo, Egypt, in 1956 to an Iraqi mother from Mosul and a Saudi Arabian father from Mecca. Her paternal grandfathers came from Yemen, hence the surname Yamani ("from Yemen"). Her early education included schooling in Baghdad, Iraq and Mecca, Saudi Arabia. She attended secondary school at the renowned Château Mont-Choisi in Lausanne, Switzerland, from 1967 to 1975. She received her bachelor's degree summa cum laude (with highest honors) from Bryn Mawr College in Pennsylvania; and subsequently attended Somerville College, University of Oxford, where she was the first Yemeni woman to obtain a M.St. and a D.Phil. from Oxford, in social anthropology.

Career
She started her career as a university lecturer in Saudi Arabia, and became a scholar at leading international think tanks in the U.S., Europe, and the Middle East. She has been a research fellow at the Royal Institute for International Affairs in London; a visiting fellow at the Brookings Institution in Washington, DC; and a visiting scholar at Carnegie Middle East Center in Beirut. She speaks fluent Arabic, English, French and Spanish, and has a working knowledge of Persian, Hebrew and Italian.

Works

References

External links
 
 Mai Yamani's commentaries at Project Syndicate

1956 births
Living people
Saudi Arabian academics
Saudi Arabian anthropologists
Social anthropologists
Bryn Mawr College alumni
Alumni of Somerville College, Oxford
Saudi Arabian people of Iraqi descent
Saudi Arabian women academics
Saudi Arabian women anthropologists
20th-century Saudi Arabian women scientists
21st-century Saudi Arabian women scientists